The Man Who Envied Women is a 1985 American film directed by Yvonne Rainer. The film is starring Jackie Raynal, Anne Friedberg and Larry Loonin in the lead roles.

Plot

Cast
 Jackie Raynal
 Anne Friedberg
 Larry Loonin
 Fronza Woods

References

External links
 

1985 films
1980s English-language films
American independent films
1980s American films